A list of Christian church buildings or ecclesiastical parishes named in honour of Saint Thomas Aquinas or having him as their patron. To be distinguished from similarly named lists of churches whose patron is
 Saint Thomas the Apostle - see St. Thomas' Church
 Saint Thomas Becket - see St Thomas à Becket Church.
They are listed by country below.

Australia
St Thomas Aquinas Church, Springwood

Canada
 St. Thomas Aquinas Church, Toronto

France
 Saint Thomas Aquinas Church, Paris

Philippines
 Saint Thomas Aquinas Parish Church, Santo Tomas, Batangas
 Saint Thomas Aquinas Parish Church, Mangaldan, Pangasinan
 Saint Thomas Aquinas Parish Church, Santo Tomas, Pangasinan

Spain 
 Saint Thomas Aquinas Church, Zaragoza

Kingdom 
 St Thomas Aquinas Church, Ham, London

United States
 St. Thomas Aquinas Chapel (Ojai, California)
 St. Thomas Aquinas Church (Palo Alto, California)
 St. Thomas Aquinas Church (Fairfield, Connecticut)
 St. Thomas Aquinas Church (Zanesville, Ohio)
 Saint Thomas Aquinas Cathedral, Reno, Nevada

See also
 List of institutions named after Thomas Aquinas

Thomas Aquinas